Aspergillus dimorphicus is a species of fungus in the genus Aspergillus. It is from the Cremei section. The species was first described in 1969. It has been reported to produce wentilactones.

Growth and morphology

A. dimorphicus has been cultivated on both Czapek yeast extract agar (CYA) plates and Malt Extract Agar Oxoid® (MEAOX) plates. The growth morphology of the colonies can be seen in the pictures below.

References 

dimorphicus
Fungi described in 1969